Tom Lutz-Hans Mickel (born April 19, 1989) is a German professional goalkeeper for 2. Bundesliga club Hamburger SV. He is a youth international for Germany.

A career backup, Mickel has spent most of his professional career at Hamburger SV apart from a two-year stint at Greuther Fürth. He has also gained 12 caps for various German national youth teams.

Club career

Early career
Mickel played in the youth departments of FC Lausitz Hoyerswerda and then Energie Cottbus, where he was promoted to the first team ahead of the 2007–08 season and mostly competed in the second team.

Hamburger SV
For the 2009–10 season, Mickel moved to Hamburger SV. There, he signed a professional contract until 30 June 2012, which was extended in October 2011 by one year, to 2013. During his time in Hamburg, Mickel was continuously number two or three in the goalkeeper depth chart. In three and a half years, Frank Rost, Jaroslav Drobný and René Adler were preferred to him. He therefore mainly appeared for the second team, Hamburger SV II, in the fourth-tier Regionalliga Nord.

Greuther Fürth
During the winter break of the 2012–13 season, Mickel moved to league rivals SpVgg Greuther Fürth six months before the expiration of his contract. He signed a contract there until 30 June 2015. There, he was utilised for the remainder of the 2012–13 season and the 2013–14 season, initially in the second team in the fourth-tier Regionalliga Bayern. Mickel made his professional debut on the 8th match-day of the 2013–14 season when he was substituted on for the injured Wolfgang Hesl in the 77th minute of the match against 1860 Munich. Five more appearances followed, in which he filled in for Hesl. Mickel would then mainly play for the second team again. After his contract expired, Mickel left the club on 30 June 2015.

Return to Hamburger SV
At the beginning of the 2015–16 season, Mickel completed a trial practice session at his former club Hamburger SV as part of the team's training camp in Graubünden in order to recommend himself for a permanent commitment. After the trial practice, Mickel was signed to the second team. He signed a contract until the end of the 2015–16 Regionalliga season. On 14 May 2016, Mickel made his Bundesliga debut for HSV in a 3–1 win over FC Augsburg on the last match-day, which was made possible by injuries to René Adler and Andreas Hirzel. Mickel made 20 appearances in the Regionalliga for HSV II.

In the 2016–17 season, Mickel beat out Hirzel for the position as third goalkeeper of the first team. He also made his second Bundesliga appearance for HSV in Augsburg when FC Augsburg beat HSV 4–0 on 30 April 2017. After the end of the season, Mickel extended his expiring contract with HSV until 2019. For the second team, Mickel was utilised in 17 games.

Towards the end of the first half of the 2017–18 season, Mickel was temporarily promoted to backup goalkeeper behind Christian Mathenia by head coach Markus Gisdol as the replacement of Julian Pollersbeck because of his good performances at practice. During the season, Mickel made five times for the second team.

Before the 2018–19 season, in which HSV played in the 2. Bundesliga for the first time after relegation, Mickel extended his contract until 30 June 2021. After Mathenia had left for newly promoted Bundesliga side 1. FC Nürnberg, Mathenia was now the backup to new first keeper Pollersbeck ahead of Morten Behrens, who had been promoted from the second team to the professional squad. Mickel appeared for HSV in the DFB Cup first round matchup under new head coach Christian Titz against Oberliga club TuS Erndtebrück and under his successor Hannes Wolf he played 3 matches in the 2. Bundesliga after Pollersbeck fell out with an injury. He also made one appearance in the Regionalliga.

A new goalkeeper, Daniel Heuer Fernandes, was ahead of the 2019–20 season and subsequently named the starter by the new head coach Dieter Hecking. Mickel was preferred as the backup goalkeeper over Pollersbeck. He also remained the backup when Heuer Fernandes was replaced by Pollersbeck on 31 May 2020, in a league match against SV Wehen Wiesbaden. From the following round, however, Heuer Fernandes was named backup to Pollersbeck with Mickel demoted to third option. While Mickel did not play a competitive game for the first team, he made two appearances in the Regionalliga for the second team.

For the 2020–21 season, Mickel was named backup to new signing Sven Ulreich by new head coach Daniel Thioune, with Heuer Fernandes completing the goalkeeping trio as third option in the HSV goal.

International career
Mickel made two appearances for the Germany U16 team in March 2005. Between September and November 2007, he was played in three games for the Germany under-19 team. At the under-19 level, Bender was a part of the team that won the 2008 European Under-19 Championship. Between September 2008 and May 2009, Mickel made three appearances for the Germany U20 side.

Personal life
Mickel was born in Hoyerswerda, East Germany on 19 April 1989.

Career statistics

Honours

International
Germany
UEFA European Under-19 Championship: 2008

References

1989 births
German footballers
Germany youth international footballers
Bundesliga players
2. Bundesliga players
Regionalliga players
Hamburger SV II players
SpVgg Greuther Fürth players
Hamburger SV players
Living people
Association football goalkeepers
FC Energie Cottbus players
FC Energie Cottbus II players
SpVgg Greuther Fürth II players
People from Hoyerswerda
Oberliga (football) players
Footballers from Saxony